"A Newfound Interest in Massachusetts" is the second single from Kansas City, Missouri band The Get Up Kids. The single, also commonly referred to as The Loveteller EP by fans, was released in 1997 on Contrast Records. The final pressing of the album was printed on orange vinyl in a limited run of 200. Each of this set was packaged in a handmade sleeve with the band's name spray-painted on, and an actual photo glued to the cover by label owner Al Barkley.

Track listing

Additional releases
The song "A Newfound Interest in Massachusetts" was re-written and released on the band's rarities and b-sides collection Eudora as "Newfound Mass (2000)".
"A Newfound Interest in Massachusetts" and "Off The Wagon" were also released on the band's EP Woodson.

Personnel
Matt Pryor - Vocals, Guitar
Jim Suptic - Guitar, Backing Vocals
Rob Pope - Bass
Ryan Pope - Drums

References

1997 singles
The Get Up Kids songs
1997 songs